Rasbora hubbsi is a species of cyprinid fish in the genus Rasbora. It is endemic to northern Borneo.

References 

Rasboras
Freshwater fish of Borneo
Taxa named by Martin Ralph Brittan
Fish described in 1954